Elkan Rogers Blout (July 2, 1919 – December 20, 2006) was a biochemist at Polaroid Corporation, Boston Children's Hospital, and the Edward S. Harkness Professor of Biological Chemistry, Emeritus at Harvard University.

Blout received his BA in chemistry in 1939 from Princeton University, and his Ph.D. in 1942 from Columbia University.

Blout was elected to the United States National Academy of Sciences in 1969. In 1990, he was awarded the National Medal of Science “for his pioneering studies of protein conformation and devotion to the scientific enterprise of the Nation.”

Blout died in December 2006, on Cuttyhunk Island.

References

External links
  
 
 
 

1919 births
2006 deaths
American biochemists
Members of the United States National Academy of Sciences
Foreign Members of the USSR Academy of Sciences
Foreign Members of the Russian Academy of Sciences
National Medal of Science laureates
Harvard Medical School faculty
People from Cambridge, Massachusetts
People from Cuttyhunk Island
Princeton University alumni
Columbia University alumni
Phillips Exeter Academy alumni
Members of the National Academy of Medicine